Loci Controls, Inc. is a developer of wireless sensor and actor network (WSAN) devices. Loci Controls develops hardware and software utilizing a wireless sensor network to optimize the extraction of methane from landfills through better landfill gas monitoring,

Background
The company was founded by two MIT graduates, Andrew Campanella and Melinda Hale in 2012.  Loci Controls received a grant from the Massachusetts Clean Energy Center in the amount of $40,000 USD in January 2014 as a partial section of its Catalyst Program. The program invests in new researchers and companies.

Projects 
On 4 August 2020, Peter Quigley, Chairman and CEO of Loci Controls Inc., reported the launch of three additional RNG ventures in Q2, culminating in dramatically expanded market share. One in Dane County, run by BIOFerm in Madison, Wisconsin, and two in Texas, one with Mas Energy on the landfill in Arlington, Texas.

Method
Loci's technology is designed for energy producing landfills, by harvesting potentially toxic methane gas from landfills and has shown to increase efficiency by 25% in at least one location.  The software and hardware provides an advancement over the existing technology that requires on-site monitoring and adjustments to optimally extract the methane utilizing wireless sensor networks. "The Loci system offers tailored alerts, a custom algorithm that predicts needed adjustments to the gas collection system, and automatic controls to monitor gas production." The reduction in methane results in less pollution, toxins and odors.: With the Loci Controls solution, revenue from landfill gas-to-energy plants is increased, risk of noncompliance is mitigated, and odor complaints can be instantly addressed."

References

External links
 A Q&A with Melinda Sims, CTO, Loci Controls
LMOP Partner Profile Loci Controls Inc.

Software companies of the United States